This is a list of museums in Moldova.

Butylka
Museum of Victims of Communism
Muzeul Memoriei Neamului
National History Museum of Moldova
National Museum of Fine Arts, Chişinău
Romanian Literature Museum, Chişinău
Soroca Fort
Ethnographic Museum, Chişinău

See also 

 List of museums
 Tourism in Moldova
 Culture of Moldova

Museums
 
Moldova
Museums
Moldova
Museums